Mweya Airport  is a small civilian airport in Uganda. It is one of the 46 airports in the country.

Location

Overview
Mweya Airport serves the area of Mweya and the neighboring areas of Queen Elizabeth National Park and the Lake Katwe Explosion Crater. As of January 2010, the airport was not under the administration of the Uganda Civil Aviation Authority. Mweya Airport receives daily flights from Murchison Falls National Park, Entebbe International Airport and Kajjansi Airfield, which are frequently used by tourists to visit Queen Elizabeth National Park.

Airlines and destinations

External links
 Uganda Civil Aviation Authority Homepage

See also
 List of airports in Uganda

References

Airports in Uganda
Kasese District